Xuanzhong Temple is a Buddhist temple located in Jiaocheng County, Shanxi, China. After Ennin introduced Pure Land Buddhism to Japan, Xuanzhong Temple is regard as one of the cradles of Pure Land Buddhism in both Chinese Buddhism and Japanese Buddhism.

History

Northern Wei
Xuanzhong Temple was built in the 470s, in the Northern Wei dynasty (386–534), the construction took four years, and lasted from 472 to 476. Tan-luan, founder of Pure Land Buddhism, settled at Xuanzhong Temple in his declining years, where he taught Pure Land school for many years, and attracted large numbers of practitioners.

Sui dynasty
In 619, namely the 5th year of Daye period in the Sui dynasty (581–618), Daochuo resided in Xuanzhong Temple and publicized Buddhism until his death in 645.

Tang dynasty
In 635, in the Zhenguan era of the Tang dynasty (618–907), Emperor Taizong visited Xuanzhong Temple, he gave many priceless treasures to the temple and honored the name "Shibi Yongning Temple". In 812, Emperor Xianzong named it "Longshan Shibi Yongning Temple".

Song dynasty
In 1090, in the reign of Emperor Zhezong in the Song dynasty (960–1127), a fire destroyed most of its buildings. The monk Daozhen reconstructed the temple.

Jin dynasty
In 1186, in the reign of Emperor Shizong in the Jin dynasty (1115–1234), the temple was demolished in a fire. Monk Yuanzhao rebuilt it.

Yuan dynasty
In 1238, the Emperor Taizong of the Yuan dynasty (1271–1368) changed its name to "Longshan Huguo Yongning Shifang Daxuanzhong Chan Temple", which known simply as "Xuanzhong Temple". Under the support of the imperial court, abbot Huixin restored the temple and the temple had reached unprecedented heyday.

Qing dynasty
During the Tongzhi and Guangxu periods (1862–1908) of the Qing dynasty (1644–1911), Xuanzhong Temple became dilapidated for neglect.

People's Republic of China
The local government began to rebuild the temple since 1954; only the Hall of Four Heavenly Kings preserves the original building of the Ming dynasty (1368–1644). In 1983, Xuanzhong Temple was designated as a National Key Buddhist Temple in Han Chinese Area by the State Council of China. In November 2012, Xuanzhong Temple was categorized as an AAAA level tourist site by the China National Tourism Administration.

Architecture
Xuanzhong Temple is built along the up and down of mountains and divided into the central, east and west routes. The entire temple faces south with the Hall of Four Heavenly Kings, Mahavira Hall, Hall of Seven-Buddha and Hall of Thousand-Buddha.

Hall of Four Heavenly Kings
The Hall of Four Heavenly Kings was built in 1605, in the late Ming dynasty (1368–1644), which is the oldest building in Xuanzhong Temple. The statues of Four Heavenly Kings are enshrined in the hall.

Mahavira Hall
The Mahavira Hall is the main hall in the temple. In the middle of the hall enshrine the Maitreya Buddha, which is the most feature of Xuanzhong Temple. On the walls are paintings of the Sixteen Arhats.

Hall of Guru
The paintings of Tan-luan, Daochuo and Shandao is enshrined in the Hall of Guru, which were presented by the Japanese monk Sugawara Ekei in September 1957.

Hall of Seven-Buddha
The Hall of Seven-Buddha is mainly for enshrining the statues of Seven-Buddha, they are Vipassī Buddha, Sikhī Buddha, Vessabhū Buddha, Krakucchanda, Koṇāgamana Buddha, Kassapa Buddha and Sakyamuni.

Pagoda

References

Further reading

External links

Buddhist temples in Lüliang
Tourist attractions in Lüliang
5th-century establishments in China
5th-century Buddhist temples